Dolichognatha umbrophila is a species of long-jawed orb weaver in the spider family Tetragnathidae. It is found in Taiwan and Japan (Okinawa Islands).

References

External links

 

Tetragnathidae
Articles created by Qbugbot
Spiders described in 1991